The 2017 National Ringette League Playoffs are the postseason tournament of 2016-17 National Ringette League season. Cambridge Turbos wins the sixth titles.

Regular Season Standing

Format 

Same as last season except the knockout stage.

In the past, 8 teams from East played, but West became 5 teams, three teams which are 2nd place to 4th place team from West will compete in knockout stage.

The draws are E3 vs E8, E4 vs E7, E5 vs E6 and the three teams from the West will play double elimination playoff and top two teams will advance.

Knockout stage

Eastern Conference

(3) Richmond Hill vs (8) Rive Sud 
Game 1

Richmond Hill leads the series 1-0

Game 2

Richmond Hill wins the series 2-0

(4) Ottawa vs (7) Gloucester 
Game 1

Ottawa leads the series 1-0

Game 2

Gloucester ties the series 1-1

Game 3

Ottawa wins the series 2-1

(5) Montreal vs (6) Waterloo 
Game 1

Waterloo leads the series 1-0

Game 2

Montreal ties the series 1-1

Game 3

Waterloo wins the series 2-1

West Conference

Standings 
 x indicates clinch the Elite Eight

(3) Manitoba vs (4) Black Gold

(2) Edmonton vs (4) Black Gold

(2) Edmonton vs (3) Manitoba

(2) Edmonton vs (4) Black Gold

Elite Eight 
x indicates clinches semifinal.
y indicates clinches final directly.
t indicates to play tiebreaker.
All games will play at Leduc Recreation Centre which located at Leduc, Alberta and Ken Nichol Regional Recreation Centre which located at Beaumont, Alberta from March 27 to March 31.

Tiebreaker
"Mini-game" The match is played until one team leads in the period. In each period the time is 10 minutes and both teams need to play for full 10 minutes.

Waterloo vs Richmond Hill 

Waterloo wins the match and advances to the semifinal

Semifinal 

Cambridge goes to the final

Final

Roster 
Cambridge Turbos
 Findlay, Melissa
 Campbell, Taylor
 Wouters, Sharolyn
 Gaudet, Jennifer
 Dupuis, Jenna
 Granger, Sydney
 Adams, Sheri
 Nosal, Paige
 Starzynski, Hannah
 McCullough, Samantha
 Jasper, Elyssa
 Nosal, Sydney
 Callander, Jessie (goalie)
Atlantic Attack
 Cormier, Sabrina
 Mason, Kirsti 
 Hollis, Ashley
 Snowdon, Jessica
 Richard, Renee
 Melanson, Kim 
 Mills, Natasha
 Cormier, Isabelle
 Doiron, Josee
 Snowdon, Jenny
 Landry, Jocelyne
 Proulx, Joelle
 LeBlanc, Dominik
 Caissie, Martine
 Gallaway, Kait
 Proulx, Miguelle
 Doiron, Karine (goalie)

Leaders 
Player except goalie
Goal 
 East: Martine Caissie (20, ATL)
 West: Dailyn Bell (13, EDM)
Assist
 East: Paige Nosal (16, CAM)
 West: Jamie Bell (15, EDM)
 Point
 East: Martine Caissie (33, ATL)
 West: Dailyn Bell (22, EDM)
Goalie
Saving %
East Danni Walser (.915, CAM)
West Lauryn Girard (.898, BGR)
Goals against average
East Nathalie Poirier (3.11, ATL)
West Breanna Beck (2.88, EDM)
Win
East Emily Ferguson (8, WAT)
West Breanna Beck (4, EDM)

References 

National Ringette League